Michael Lejsek (born 24 February 1998) is a Czech luger who competes internationally.
 
He represented his country at the 2022 Winter Olympics.

References

External links
 
 
 

1998 births
Living people
Czech male lugers
Olympic lugers of the Czech Republic
Lugers at the 2016 Winter Youth Olympics
Lugers at the 2022 Winter Olympics
People from Kadaň
Sportspeople from the Ústí nad Labem Region